Avanavancherry is a village in Thiruvananthapuram district in the state of Kerala, India.

Avanavanchery is located near Attingal in Thiruvananthapuram District of Kerala. This residential area is situated between Moonnu mukku and Valakkad on Attingal – Venjaramoodu Road. Avanavanchery is around 3 km from Attingal, 3 km from Valakkad, and 8.5 km from Venjaramoodu. Main landmarks are  Avanavanchery Juma Masjid Temple, Avanavanchery Sree Indilayappan, Avanavanchery Telephone Exchange, Sub Station, Govt. High School etc. The nearest railheads are Kadakkavur Railway Station and Chirayinkil Railway Station. Airport close to Avanavancherry is Trivandrum International Airport.

References

Villages in Thiruvananthapuram district